Reed frog may refer to:

 African reed frog, a frog found in Africa
 Madagascan reed frog, a frog endemic to Madagascar
 Ochlandrae reed frog, a frog endemic to the Western Ghats, India

Animal common name disambiguation pages